The Jeremiah Reeves House and Carriage House is located at 325 East Iron Avenue in Dover, Tuscarawas County, Ohio. The house is also alternatively known as the Dover Historical Museum and the J.E. Reeves Victorian Home and Carriage House Museum. The property was listed on the National Register on 1982-07-15.

History

The house was built in 1870 by Valentine Wills as a two-story farmhouse. The brick house had large spacious rooms with high ceilings. When Jeremiah E. Reeves, an industrialist and banker, purchased the house in 1898 he extensively remodeled the house to meet his high standards of living. The house was transformed into a 17-room Italianate mansion house, equipped with a ballroom, drawing room, and a large dining room, to name a few. The Reeves family moved into the home in 1901 and within a short time the area came to be known as Reeves Heights.

The house was situated on a small hill overlooking the river and was close to the rolling mills Reeves had purchased for his steel business. The area grew as more and more Reeves relatives built homes around the original property.

Jeremiah Reeves died in the house in 1920, and the house remained occupied until the death of his wife, Jane, in 1926. The house was vacant save for a few times of sporadic inhabitation by the Reeves family and underwent a "modernization" in the 1940s. The Dover Historical Society (DHS) obtained title to the property when the last remaining child of Jeremiah Reeves died. The DHS restored the home with the help of Samuel Reeves, Jr. until his death in 1977.

The property is maintained today as a museum by the DHS and showcases life during the Victorian Era.

References

External links
Official site for the Reeves House

Carriage houses
Houses on the National Register of Historic Places in Ohio
Second Empire architecture in Ohio
Queen Anne architecture in Ohio
Italianate architecture in Ohio
Houses completed in 1870
Museums in Tuscarawas County, Ohio
National Register of Historic Places in Tuscarawas County, Ohio
Carriage museums in the United States
Transportation museums in Ohio
Historic house museums in Ohio
Houses in Tuscarawas County, Ohio